In mathematics, the immanant of a matrix was defined by Dudley E. Littlewood and Archibald Read Richardson as a generalisation of the concepts of determinant and permanent.

Let  be a partition of an integer  and let  be the corresponding irreducible representation-theoretic character of the symmetric group . The immanant of an  matrix  associated with the character  is defined as the expression

Examples

The determinant is a special case of the immanant, where  is the alternating character , of Sn, defined by the parity of a permutation.

The permanent is the case where  is the trivial character, which is identically equal to 1.

As stated above,  produces the permanent and  produces the determinant, but  produces the operation that maps as follows:

Properties
The immanant shares several properties with determinant and permanent. In particular, the immanant is multilinear in the rows and columns of the matrix; and the immanant is invariant under simultaneous permutations of the rows or columns by the same element of the symmetric group. 

Littlewood and Richardson studied the relation of the immanant to Schur functions in the representation theory of the symmetric group.

The necessary and sufficient conditions for the immanant of a Gram matrix to be  are given by Gamas's Theorem.

References

 
 

Algebra
Linear algebra
Matrix theory
Permutations